Wayne Black and Kevin Ullyett were the defending champions but lost in the quarterfinals to Wayne Arthurs and Paul Hanley.

Jonas Björkman and Todd Woodbridge won in the final 6–3, 6–4 against Arthurs and Hanley.

Seeds

  Jonas Björkman /  Todd Woodbridge (champions)
  Wayne Arthurs /  Paul Hanley (final)
  Jared Palmer /  David Rikl (quarterfinals)
  Gastón Etlis /  Martín Rodríguez (semifinals)

Draw

External links
 2003 If Stockholm Open Doubles Draw

Doubles
2003 Stockholm Open